In the context of telecommunications, a terminal is a device which ends a telecommunications link and is the point at which a signal enters or leaves a network. Examples of terminal equipment include telephones, fax machines, computer terminals, printers and workstations.

An end instrument is a piece of equipment connected to the wires at the end of a telecommunications link. In telephony, this is usually a telephone connected to a local loop.  End instruments that relate to data terminal equipment include printers, computers, barcode readers, automated teller machines (ATMs) and the console ports of routers.

See also 
 Communication endpoint
 Data terminal equipment
 End system
 Host (network)
 Node (networking)

 Terminal equipment

References

External links 
 Directive 1999/5/EC of the European Parliament and of the Council of 9 March 1999 on radio equipment and telecommunications terminal equipment and the mutual recognition of their conformity (R&TTE Directive).

Telecommunications equipment